Oak Investment Partners is a private equity firm focusing on venture capital investments in companies developing communications systems, information technology, new Internet media, healthcare services and retail.

History
The firm, founded in 1978, is based in Greenwich, Connecticut, with offices in Norwalk, Connecticut, Minneapolis and Palo Alto, California. Since inception, Oak had invested in more than 480 companies and had raised more than  $8.4 billion in investor commitments across 12 private equity funds. Ann Lamont is a founder and managing partner.

In May 2006, Oak raised its 12th fund, at $2.56 billion, reportedly the largest venture capital fund ever raised.

In 2015, Indian-born employee Iftikar Ahmed was sued by the U.S. Securities and Exchange Commission on suspicion of stealing US$65 million from the firm. Ahmed was believed to have fled to India.  In August 2015, Fortune reported that Mr. Ahmed had been detained in an Indian prison from May 22 until July 23 and that his passport had been confiscated.

References

External links

Oak Investment Partners (Company website)
 

Private equity firms of the United States
Venture capital firms of the United States
Life sciences industry
Companies based in Greenwich, Connecticut
American companies established in 1978
Financial services companies established in 1978
1978 establishments in Connecticut